The 2024 Nevada Republican presidential caucuses will be held on February 24, 2024, as part of the Republican Party primaries for the 2024 presidential election. 26 delegates to the 2024 Republican National Convention will be allocated on a proportional basis. Held following the Iowa caucuses and the New Hampshire primary, the contest is set to vote concurrently with South Carolina as the third contests in the primary.

Background 
In 2012, a report by Reuters described the Republican electorate in Nevada as "libertarian-minded". Eric Herzik, a professor of political science at the University of Nevada, Reno, argued that Republican voters in the state are more animated by fiscal issues than social conservatism.

2016 caucus 
Donald Trump won the 2016 Nevada caucus with 45.9% of the vote and 14 out of 30 pledged delegates, with closest opponents Marco Rubio and Ted Cruz taking 23.9% and 21.4% of the vote, respectively. During the campaign, both Rubio and Cruz vied for the support of Mormons in Nevada, who form an influential bloc within the state party.

Candidates

Declared candidates 
Former president Trump and former Governor of South Carolina Governor and U.S. Ambassador to the United Nations Nikki Haley are the only main contenders to officially announce their candidacy.

Potential candidates 
Florida governor Ron DeSantis is widely expected to announce his candidacy as soon as May 2023. Former vice president Mike Pence is reportedly considering running for the Republican Presidential Nomination. 

Other Republicans reportedly considering a candidacy include Senator Tim Scott of South Carolina; former Governors Chris Christie of New Jersey, Asa Hutchinson of Arkansas, former Secretary of State Mike Pompeo, and governors Glenn Youngkin of Virginia and Kristi Noem of South Dakota.

Campaign 
In March 2023, it was reported that Trump hosted a range of Nevada Republican Party officials at Mar-a-Lago as part of his campaign's "aggressive outreach to state and local party officials in the early primary states."

Endorsements

Polling

See also 
 2024 Republican Party presidential primaries
 2024 United States presidential election
 2024 United States presidential election in Nevada
 2024 United States elections

Notes

References 

Nevada Republican caucuses
Republican presidential caucuses
Nevada